Eucithara macteola is a small sea snail, a marine gastropod mollusk in the family Mangeliidae.

Description
The shell size attains 9.4 mm, its diameter 4.2 mm.

Distribution
This marine species has been found on the inner continental shelf of Zululand, South Africa.

References

 Kilburn R.N. 1992. Turridae (Mollusca: Gastropoda) of southern Africa and Mozambique. Part 6. Subfamily Mangeliinae, section 1. Annals of the Natal Museum, 33: 461–575
  Tucker, J.K. 2004 Catalog of recent and fossil turrids (Mollusca: Gastropoda). Zootaxa 682:1-1295.

Endemic fauna of South Africa
macteola
Gastropods described in 1992